The Mokṣopāya or Mokṣopāyaśāstra is a Sanskrit philosophical text on salvation for non-ascetics (mokṣa-upāya: 'means to liberation'), written on the Pradyumna hill in Śrīnagar in the 10th century AD. It has the form of a public sermon and claims human authorship and contains about 30,000 śloka's (making it longer than the Rāmāyaṇa). The main part of the text forms a dialogue between Vasiṣṭha and Rāma, interchanged with numerous short stories and anecdotes to illustrate the content. This text was later (11th to the 14th century AD) expanded and vedanticized, which resulted in the Yogavāsiṣṭha.

Philosophy
The text of the Mokṣopāya shows that a unique philosophy has been created by the author. It taught a monism ('advaita') that is different from Advaita Vedanta. It makes use of other Darśanas in an inclusive way. The text teaches that the recognition that cognitive objects are non-existent, leads to ultimate detachment, which causes an attitude of "dispassion and non-involvement with worldly things and matters", though still fulfilling one's daily duties and activities. This liberation is available for everyone, no matter their sex, caste or education, as long as one uses reason and maintains an active life in this world. To reach this liberation, one has to go through three stages: rational thinking and discernment (vicāra), true understanding (jñāna) and detachment (vairāgya).

It is only by one's own effort (pauruṣa) that one can be liberated from the bonds of existence. For one who knows the reality, "fate" (daiva) does not mean anything, something like "fate" does not exist and has, accordingly, no consequences at all.

Mokṣopāya Project

The Mokṣopāya Project supervised by professor Walter Slaje at the Martin Luther University of Halle-Wittenberg in Germany is currently working on a critical edition of the Mokṣopāya. The project is embedded in the Centre for Research in the Historiography and Intellectual Culture of Kashmir (under the Patronage of the Academy of Sciences and Literature, Mainz). A commentary by Bhāskarakaṇṭha ("Mokṣopāya-ṭīkā"; late 17th century AD) and more than thirty manuscripts in Nāgarī, Śāradā, Grantha, and Telugu scripts are being used.

The goal of the project is a critical edition of the complete Sanskrit text, accompanied by a German translation, a philological commentary and a dictionary of its Sanskrit vocabulary.

See also
Buddhism and Hinduism in Kashmir
Yogavāsiṣṭha

References

Further reading
 Chapple, Christopher Key; Chakrabarti, Arindam (2015). Engaged Emancipation: Mind, Morals, and Make-Believe in the Moksopaya (Yogavasistha). State University of New York Press, Albany. .
Hanneder, Jürgen (2005). The Mokṣopāya, Yogavāsiṣṭha and related texts. (Geisteskultur Indiens 7). Aachen, Shaker. .
Hanneder, Jürgen (2006). Studies on the Mokṣopāya. (Abhandlungen für die Kunde des Morgenlandes 58). Wiesbaden, Harrassowitz. .
 Hanneder, Jürgen (2012). Mokṣopāya - Weg zur Erlösung.  P. Kirchheim Verlag, München. .
Slaje, Walter (1994). Vom Mokṣopāya-Śāstra zum Yogavāsiṣṭha-Mahārāmāyaṇa. Philologische Untersuchungen zur Entwicklungs- und Überlieferunsgeschichte eines indischen Lehrwerks mit Anspruch auf Heilsrelevanz. Wien, Verl. d. Österreich. Akad. d. Wiss. . 
Slaje, Walter (2005). Locating the Mokṣopāya. In: The Mokṣopāya, Yogavāsiṣṭha and Related Texts. Ed. Jürgen Hanneder. (Geisteskultur Indiens. Texte und Studien 7. [Indologica Halensis]). Aachen 2005: 21–35. 
Slaje, Walter (2020). Vasiṣṭha the Void: Inquiries into the Authorship of the Mokṣopāya. ZIS 37 (2020): 168–204.

Edition 

 Krause-Stinner, Susanne (2011). Mokṣopāya. Das Erste und Zweite Buch. Vairāgyaprakaraṇa. Mumukṣuvyavahāraprakaraṇa. (Anonymus Casmiriensis: Mokṣopāya. Historisch-kritische Gesamtausgabe. Herausgegeben unter der Leitung von Walter Slaje. Textedition. Teil 1). [Akademie der Wissenschaften und der Literatur, Mainz. Veröffentlichungen der Indologischen Kommission]. Wiesbaden, Harrassowitz. .
 Hanneder, Jürgen; Stephan, Peter; Jager, Stanislav (2011). Mokṣopāya. Das Dritte Buch. Utpattiprakaraṇa. (Anonymus Casmiriensis: Mokṣopāya. Historisch-kritische Gesamtausgabe. Herausgegeben unter der Leitung von Walter Slaje. Textedition. Teil 2). [Akademie der Wissenschaften und der Literatur, Mainz. Veröffentlichungen der Indologischen Kommission]. Wiesbaden, Harrassowitz. .
 Krause-Stinner, Susanne; Stephan, Peter (2012). Mokṣopāya. Das Vierte Buch. Sthitiprakaraṇa. (Anonymus Casmiriensis: Mokṣopāya. Historisch-kritische Gesamtausgabe. Herausgegeben unter der Leitung von Walter Slaje. Textedition. Teil 3). [Akademie der Wissenschaften und der Literatur, Mainz. Veröffentlichungen der Indologischen Kommission]. Wiesbaden, Harrassowitz. .
 Krause-Stinner, Susanne; Stephan, Peter (2013). Mokṣopāya. Das Fünfte Buch. Upaśāntiprakaraṇa. (Anonymus Casmiriensis: Mokṣopāya. Historisch-kritische Gesamtausgabe. Herausgegeben unter der Leitung von Walter Slaje. Textedition. Teil 4). [Akademie der Wissenschaften und der Literatur, Mainz. Veröffentlichungen der Indologischen Kommission]. Wiesbaden, Harrassowitz. .
 Krause-Stinner, Susanne; Stephan, Peter (2018). Mokṣopāya. Das Sechste Buch. Nirvāṇaprakaraṇa. 1. Teil: Kapitel 1–119. (Anonymus Casmiriensis: Mokṣopāya. Historisch-kritische Gesamtausgabe. Herausgegeben unter der Leitung von Walter Slaje. Textedition. Teil 5). [Akademie der Wissenschaften und der Literatur, Mainz. Veröffentlichungen der Fächergruppenkommission für Außereuropäische Sprachen und Kulturen. Studien zur Indologie]. Wiesbaden, Harrassowitz. .
Krause-Stinner, Susanne; Krause, Anett; Stephan, Peter (2019). Mokṣopāya. Das Sechste Buch. Nirvāṇaprakaraṇa. 2. Teil: Kapitel 120–252. (Anonymus Casmiriensis: Mokṣopāya. Historisch-kritische Gesamtausgabe. Herausgegeben unter der Leitung von Walter Slaje. Textedition. Teil 6). [Akademie der Wissenschaften und der Literatur, Mainz. Veröffentlichungen der Fächergruppenkommission für Außereuropäische Sprachen und Kulturen. Studien zur Indologie]. Wiesbaden, Harrassowitz. .

Philological translation (German) 

 Steiner, Roland (2014). Der Weg zur Befreiung. Das Erste und Zweite Buch. Das Buch über die Leidenschaftslosigkeit. Das Buch über das Verhalten der Befreiungssucher. (Anonymus Casmiriensis: Mokṣopāya. Historisch-kritische Gesamtausgabe. Herausgegeben unter der Leitung von Walter Slaje. Übersetzung. Teil 1). [Akademie der Wissenschaften und der Literatur, Mainz. Veröffentlichungen der Indologischen Kommission]. Wiesbaden, Harrassowitz. .
 Steiner, Roland (2013). Der Weg zur Befreiung. Das Vierte Buch. Das Buch über das Dasein. (Anonymus Casmiriensis: Mokṣopāya. Historisch-kritische Gesamtausgabe. Herausgegeben unter der Leitung von Walter Slaje. Übersetzung. Teil 3). [Akademie der Wissenschaften und der Literatur, Mainz. Veröffentlichungen der Indologischen Kommission]. Wiesbaden, Harrassowitz. .
 Steiner, Roland (2015). Der Weg zur Befreiung. Das Fünfte Buch. Das Buch über das Zurruhekommen. (Anonymus Casmiriensis: Mokṣopāya. Historisch-kritische Gesamtausgabe. Herausgegeben unter der Leitung von Walter Slaje. Übersetzung. Teil 4). [Akademie der Wissenschaften und der Literatur, Mainz. Veröffentlichungen der Indologischen Kommission]. Wiesbaden, Harrassowitz. .
 Steiner, Roland (2018). Der Weg zur Befreiung. Das Sechste Buch. Das Buch über das Nirvāṇa. 1. Teil: Kapitel 1–119.  (Anonymus Casmiriensis: Mokṣopāya. Historisch-kritische Gesamtausgabe. Herausgegeben unter der Leitung von Walter Slaje. Übersetzung. Teil 5). [Akademie der Wissenschaften und der Literatur, Mainz. Veröffentlichungen der Fächergruppenkommission für Außereuropäische Sprachen und Kulturen. Studien zur Indologie]. Wiesbaden, Harrassowitz. .

Textual commentary 

 Straube, Martin (2016). Mokṣopāya. Das Vierte Buch. Sthitiprakaraṇa. (Anonymus Casmiriensis: Mokṣopāya. Historisch-kritische Gesamtausgabe. Herausgegeben unter der Leitung von Walter Slaje. Stellenkommentar. Teil 3). [Akademie der Wissenschaften und der Literatur, Mainz. Veröffentlichungen der Indologischen Kommission]. Wiesbaden,  Harrassowitz. .

External links

Website of the Mokṣopāya Project (includes introduction, bibliography and gallery)
Manuscript of the Mokṣopāya from the collection of Makhan Lal Kokilu, Śrīnagar, scanned by eGangotri.

Metaphysics literature
Sanskrit texts
Advaita
Madhyamaka
Yogacara
Kashmir Shaivism
10th-century Indian books